Khan al-Franj is an Ottoman caravanserai in Sidon, Lebanon.

History
The construction of Khan al-Franj is commonly, though erroneously attributed to the Druze emir and governor of Sidon Eyalet, Fakhr al-Din II. The complex's actual founder was Grand Vizier Sokollu Mehmed Pasha (d. 1579). It received its modern name, which translates as "Caravansary of the Franks", from its French mercantile occupants in the 17th century. It housed the French consul around 1616 until the consul relocated to a neighboring property, formerly owned by Fakhr al-Din's Ma'n family, the Dar al-Musilmani, in the 1630s.

References

Bibliography

16th-century establishments in Ottoman Syria
Caravanserais
Sidon